Lamberto II da Polenta (died 1347) was briefly jointly lord of Ravenna and Cervia from 1346 until his death.

He was the son of Ostasio I da Polenta. In 1346 he inherited the family lordships together with his brothers Bernardino I and Pandolfo. Bernardino, however, had both Pandolfo and Lamberto imprisoned in Cervia after one year, where they died of starvation.

See also
Da Polenta

1347 deaths
Lamberto 2
14th-century Italian nobility
Deaths by starvation
Year of birth unknown
Lords of Ravenna